Kildeer is a village in southwestern Lake County, Illinois, United States, and a suburb of Chicago. Per the 2020 census, the population was 4,091. It has limited development to custom houses on large lots, and has worked to preserve natural features and open space.

History

This area was largely rural and made up of farms and undeveloped lands until after World War II. Increased population and pent-up demand for housing resulted in new suburban development outside many major cities, aided by federal investment in highways that eased commuting to work. Lake County began to prepare by paving its roads and improving some. The Kildeer area began to attract persons who wanted to live a relatively rural life. In 1951 Quentin Road was realigned, removing the four right-angle turns, and substituting a smooth curve north from Rand Road. In 1952 its entire length was paved.

In the mid-1950s, Henry Bosch Jr. submitted a residential subdivision to the county containing mostly  homesites. On April 15, 1955 it was approved and called Boschome Farms. Bosch wanted to retain strict control of his subdivision and refused to sell lots to builders. As a condition of sale, each purchaser had to submit plans for their residence to Bosch and receive his approval prior to building. Not long after, the land south of Boschome Farms was subdivided as Long Grove Valley. Unit I was approved September 16, 1955, Unit 2 on February 1, 1957 and Unit 3 on June 20, 1957.

Brickman Builders

On October 16, 1958, Brickman Builders of Chicago announced their intent to build a planned community "of the future" consisting of 20,000 residential units in Ela Township, Lake County. It would contain 16,000 single-family homes, 6,000 apartments or duplex units, one high school, four junior high schools, 29 grade schools, a country club, and ten church sites. Ten percent of the area would be reserved for industrial use. The development would have an ultimate population of 60,000 and take 15 years to build. There would be a central shopping mall at West Cuba and Quentin Road containing a major department store, a variety store, ten small shops, one or more supermarkets, a bank, two drugstores, two restaurants, a professional and medical center, with provisions for parking 2,500 cars. Six smaller shopping centers were also to be located in neighborhoods.

When Joseph M. Brickman announced his "billion dollar city", he claimed to have bought or had options on 2,000 of the required . He said it would be the largest planned community in the country. It would bring organized development with planned infrastructure and amenities to the projected rapid growth of the area. Existing residents were surprised, as many had moved here to enjoy the tranquil countryside. They learned that Brickman intended to incorporate his land as a village. If there were 100 residents and 35 voters living within the prescribed boundaries, they could hold a referendum to establish a village form of government. The existing residents feared that Brickman could effectively select individuals to have voted into office, and form his own government, passing codes and ordinances to serve his own interests.

In the summer of 1957 Brickman began building a subdivision on Sturm's farm, located on the south side of Rand Road just west of Quentin Road. He rented the completed homes to Brickman real estate agents and other company employees. Surrounding residents became suspicious when they learned that such renters were paying only $50 per month for a three-bedroom house. Brickman was rumored to be moving migrant farm workers into structures on other properties. People became convinced that Brickman would shortly incorporate the Sturm Subdivision and systematically annex his adjacent parcels. Brickman was seeking rezoning from Lake County of the latter properties in order to permit small lots, which would enable more dense development.

Inspired by longtime resident Dorothea Huszagh, local residents organized and petitioned to hold a referendum on incorporating a municipality. Brickman attempted to move a small red barn west on East Cuba Road to use as housing for his workers. Although the barn was mounted on a truck, it could not be transported across the one-lane bridge over Buffalo Creek because of large overhanging oak tree branches. The foreman ordered the branches to be cut down but neighbors told him the tree was on private property and a confrontation ensued. By the time the County police arrived, Rudy Huszagh had fired a rifle into the ground to stop the workmen. The police ordered the workers to take the barn back to the farm and dispersed the residents.

On September 8, 1996, the village of Kildeer mounted a plaque on the bridge dedicating it as a memorial to Dorothea Huszagh, who died in 1995, and to others who had opposed the 1950s planned development of this area.

Incorporation

On March 22, 1958, residents held a referendum on the question of establishing the Village of Kildeer. Area residents voted to incorporate the new village with a population of 153, making it the 32nd municipality in Lake County. The polling place for this election was the home of Dorothea Huszagh. Brickman filed suit to have the referendum overturned, asking the support of Deer Park and Long Grove village boards to support the dissolution of the village of Kildeer. They declined, as these villages had been incorporated in 1957 and 1959 as protection against being included in Brickman's grand plan.

The Lake Zurich village board voted four to three against Brickman's county rezoning attempt. Just prior to their vote, the same board had voted to rescind their required $275 contribution per home and 10 percent land dedication by builders. Some analysts thought Brickman had intended to gain rezoning by first annexing his land to Lake Zurich and later disconnecting to form a separate village.

In April 1958 a meeting of Kildeer village residents was held. The following people were selected and sworn in to serve as Kildeer's first officials.
President - J. Larry Powell
Village Clerk - Hertha G. Severance
Trustees - Edwin G. Bradshaw, Harold S. Faber, Richard W. Huszagh, Harry P. Keeley Jr., C. J. Lauer, P. H. Severance
Police Magistrate - Samuel S. LaBue

About March 12, 1959, the Lake County Board unanimously rejected Brickman's small lot zoning request. He sued to reverse the Board's decision, but in September the Circuit Court of Waukegan upheld the decision. In November Brickman lost his challenge of the Kildeer referendum; he said he would appeal the case to the Illinois Supreme Court. On June 9, 1960, the Supreme Court found in favor of Kildeer. The battle was over.

The new Kildeer village board had many tasks: First, it had to dispose of legal bills accumulated from opposing Brickman. Not having any revenue sources, the board appealed for contributions from the 45 families that made up the village. The funds received fell short by only $362.00, indicating a strong community spirit. The village president and three trustees (because of staggered terms) were appointed to one-year terms only. The first official village election was held in April 1959, at which time a new president, Harry P. Keeley, Jr., and three new trustees were elected. These officials, along with the three remaining trustees, went to work establishing commissions, ordinances, codes and sources of revenue. This was no small task. Without a public facility, all meetings were held in their homes and long hours spent on village business.

A small contingent of residents began agitating to abolish Kildeer and merge into the village of Long Grove. The issue became so heated that some members of village commissions submitted resignations. President Keeley wrote a letter to all village officials and staff stating,

"The resignations that have been handed to the village board within the past month are very alarming to me as the President of the Board, and I am deeply concerned over the internal strife which has been going on. It seems to me that as adults, with reasoning power that has been given to us, we should be able to resolve our differences in an adult manner. We are doing to ourselves what Mr. Brickman with all of his law suits could not do. We are being destroyed from within by smear campaigns, rumors, half truths, etc. I am in hopes that the gentlemen who submitted their resignations will reconsider and will realize that our differences can never be resolved by any means other than hard work, gathering of facts, and reasoning." "The Board and I have seen fit at this time to not accept the resignations, a matter on which we shall have to take action at the special meeting that I am calling for next Monday night to finish much business that we were not able to get to at our regular meeting."

President Keeley appointed a special representative to gather information relating to a merger with Long Grove. He went to great lengths accumulating the facts and summarizing his own views on the negative aspects of such a merger in a letter to the Board of Trustees containing the following closing statement. "In light of the facts mentioned above, I feel that though we have won the battle of Brickman, we have lost the war for self preservation and home rule. I feel that your part in this administration is a failure if you condone the merger with Long Grove. I cannot and will not be part of such a movement. Therefore, with sincere regret and much sorrow, I herewith submit my resignation as President of the Village of Kildeer." Records show President Keeley served out his four-year term and the merger with Long Grove obviously did not occur. It must be assumed the majority of the village board supported their President's position and convinced him to withdraw his resignation, but the issue would be sensitive to some for many years to come.

President Keeley was confronted with many challenges during his administration. In 1961 the Lake County Forest Preserve District announced its plan for a new forest preserve on Kildeer property bounded by West Cuba Road, Quentin Road and Rand Road or what is now known as Pine Valley subdivision. In 1959 the Ela Area Planning Board (EAPB) was formed to control development and moderate border disputes between the growing local villages. It was composed of one representative from each village within the township. When the forest preserve plan was presented to the EAPB they voted in favor of it 6 to 2, with one of the 2 being Kildeer's representative. Kildeer circulated a petition in opposition and obtained 200 signatures. Further details are not available but obviously Kildeer prevailed.

An interesting event took place during Keeley's administration that seemed to set a precedent for the entire village. Keep in mind, there were only two residential subdivisions in the entire village at the time, Boschome Farms and Long Grove Valley. The Board passed an ordinance to construct a barricade closing Grove Drive just north of Linden Lane so the two subdivisions were disconnected and it was not possible for Boschome Farms residents to exit to Long Grove Road on Valley Road. The ordinance was based on an Illinois statute giving municipalities the authority to establish "Pleasure Driveways", eliminating their status as public roads. Valley Road became a Pleasure Driveway, and a dirt berm was constructed across the road at the designated location. At some unknown time, the dirt berm was removed and Boschome Farm residents could again drive through Long Grove Valley.

Arthur T. Mcintosh proposed the first subdivision in the village of Kildeer, calling it "Farmington". The village board eagerly looked forward to tax revenues from the commercial businesses to help make the village solvent. This plan was approved by the village board on July 2, 1962. Units 2, 3 and 4 followed in 1964, 1966 and 1968. One acre home-sites sold for $10,000. On the west side of Quentin Road, the grazing land where Jersey cows would spend hot summer days sleeping under oak trees also succumbed to development. Subdivision of Pine Valley Unit I was approved in 1964, Unit 2 in 1967, Unit 3 in 1969, Unit 4 in 1972 and Unit 5 in 1976. Kildeer had hoped the area would remain unspoiled, but progress was quickly approaching, and the village had to prepare itself with controlling subdivision, building and zoning ordinances as well as a master plan for development.

Facilities
To dispose of sewage, all Kildeer residences had septic fields. Soils in the area were of the type considered "extreme" for this purpose, and septic fields in general in Lake County were experiencing difficulties, adding to the pollution of local streams, rivers and lakes. The Lake County Health Department progressively increased their standards to eliminate a growing problem. A longtime resident and Kildeer trustee, Frank Angelotti, had his own civil engineering company doing consulting work for other villages. He was aware of federal funds available through the Illinois Environmental Protection Agency (IEPA) to assist municipalities in the construction of local sewers. Early in 1975, Trustee Angelotti, at his own expense, prepared schematic drawings of a sewer system for the entire village of Kildeer. The system would tie into a new Lake County interceptor sewer to be installed on Quentin Road for relieving Lake Zurich's sewage treatment plant. Lake County, by agreement and service charges, would provide all sewage treatment. He presented his plan to the Kildeer Village Board.

In addition to serving Kildeer, it was proposed to extend sewers to Rand Road. Having the only sewer system in the area would give Kildeer complete control of any and all development along Rand Road and its surrounding borders. The residential system was designed for 4½ people per acre which would limit and control the density of residential development. If approved, the IEPA would provide 75% funding for the project. Seeing the merits of this project and the fact federal funding would be a one-time opportunity, the village board moved to submit an application to the IEPA. The construction estimate was $1,811,000, of which Kildeer's 25% share would be $452,750, or $834 per residential lot. The first step was accomplished on December 16, 1975, when the Lake County Regional Planning Commission endorsed the plan. On May 26, 1976, a grant application for $1,358,250 was sent to the IEPA, and approval was received on June 25.

To confirm all costs, construction and engineering bids were solicited on March 15, 1977. Quotations were within the budget and a village referendum was held on May 14 with citizens approving the financing of 25% of project costs. A review of proposals resulted in the village board selecting the Crystal Lake firm of Baxter-Woodman to provide engineering services. About this time a small group of protesters began to oppose the project on the premise that sewers in Kildeer would promote and accelerate development in and around the village. The opposition communicated with all governmental agencies in an unsuccessful attempt to gain their support. The lack of an immediate response by the village to their request for copies of 221 documents resulted in lawsuits brought against the village President, Clerk and Trustee Angelotti.

Letters to newspaper editors and circulated flyers containing inaccurate information disturbed and confused residents. A false rumor was circulated stating "strings" were attached to the federal funds that would require "low cost" housing in Kildeer. A petition was circulated to stop the project, but signers were told it was only for the purpose of gaining more detailed information from the village. Without reading the petition, many people signed. These signatures were presented to the village board as evidence Kildeer residents did not want the project to proceed. When this ruse surfaced, many people wrote to the village office correcting their position and asking their names be removed. Supporters for sewers threatened the village with legal action if they did not proceed with construction based on the will of the people determined by referendum.

Delays caused by this controversy precluded the start of engineering. The village engineer prepared a new estimate based on current escalated costs that indicated a considerable increase above the amount approved in the IEPA application. In spite of harassment by the opposition, both the Lake County Health Department and IEPA continued to support the project. The only solution for bringing costs back within the budget was to revise plans eliminating long runs of sewers to areas with minimum users. These would be installed and paid for by future developers.

On October 22, 1979, the IEPA notified Kildeer that the reduction in scope of their sewer project resulted in a lower funding priority rating and a determination could not be made when financing would be available. Kildeer had lost the 75% federal funding. On December 6, 1979, the village board voted to accept the lower priority status, and the sewer project was abandoned. This event was the single largest loss to Kildeer for any attempt to control development adjacent to its borders.

Police department
In 1975 Kildeer established a part-time police department. Many of the officers were Lake Zurich paramedics. With the increase in village and area population, the department was made full-time in 1988.

Killdeer kept its small municipal offices in the Village Clerk's home. In 1989 the position of full-time Village Administrator was established. The most qualified municipal employee, the former clerk, was selected to fill the position. During her tenure, she had earned a certificate in management from the International City Management Association. The village and police offices have been housed in the lower level of her residence since 1979.

Growth in the area began to accelerate, and developers annexed their properties to neighboring communities, enlarging their borders and virtually landlocking Kildeer. Lacking the ability to offer utilities as an inducement for developers to annex to Kildeer, the village negotiated other concessions so as to expand the village limits. The village approved a subdivision called Beacon Hill, consisting of houses on smaller lots but with considerable open space in and around the development. Through this, Kildeer annexed land on the north side of Route 22, effectively being able to influence other nearby development. These homes are served by sewers connected to the Lake County sewage treatment facility.

In 1990 the village negotiated capacity in Lake Zurich's trunkline to the Lake County sewage treatment facility. This would allow the central portion of Kildeer to have the ability to create sewer districts. Since establishing the first sewer facility plan in 1988, Kildeer has approved subdivisions designed with sewer infrastructure to accommodate future connections of upstream developments.

Over the decades, higher density developments have been established surrounding Kildeer, while it remains an island of rural countryside. The village faces new pressures, as some residents want to preserve the rural atmosphere while others prefer increased services and programs that require the need for new sources of revenue. Other nearby communities may offer urban services and municipal recreation, but Kildeer offers open space and a more self-sufficient private lifestyle.

Demographics

2020 census

Note: the US Census treats Hispanic/Latino as an ethnic category. This table excludes Latinos from the racial categories and assigns them to a separate category. Hispanics/Latinos can be of any race.

2000 Census
As of the census of 2000, there were 3,460 people, 1,077 households, and 1,001 families residing in the village. The racial makeup of the village was 93.82% White, 0.92% African American, 4.28% Asian, 0.38% from other races, and 0.61% from two or more races. Hispanic or Latino people of any race were 2.31% of the population.

There were 1,077 households, out of which 51.1% had children under the age of 18 living with them, 88.0% were married couples living together, 3.1% had a female householder with no husband present, and 7.0% were non-families. 5.4% of all households were made up of individuals, and 1.8% had someone living alone who was 65 years of age or older. The average household size was 3.21 and the average family size was 3.34.

In the village, the population was spread out, with 32.5% under the age of 18, 4.2% from 18 to 24, 26.9% from 25 to 44, 30.1% from 45 to 64, and 6.2% who were 65 years of age or older. The median age was 39 years. For every 100 females, there were 98.1 males. For every 100 females age 18 and over, there were 96.6 males.

The median income for a household in the village was $137,498, and the median income for a family was $140,270. Males had a median income of $100,000+ versus $41,607 for females. The per capita income for the village was $51,973. About 0.4% of families and 0.5% of the population were below the poverty line, including none of those under age 18 and 1.9% of those age 65 or over.

Education
The village is served by three highly accredited public school districts: Lake Zurich Community Unit School District 95, Kildeer Countryside Community Consolidated School District 96 and Consolidated High School District 125. In addition, there are several nearby parochial schools.

Schools
Kildeer formerly was served by Charles Quentin Elementary School in Palatine part of District 95. It is now served by Isaac Fox Elementary School in nearby Lake Zurich.

The village feeds into one of two high schools: Lake Zurich High School and Adlai E. Stevenson High School.

District 95 portion:
Isaac Fox Elementary School (K-5)
Lake Zurich Middle School South (6-8)
Lake Zurich High School (9-12)

District 96/125 portion:
Kildeer Elementary School (K-5)
Country Meadows Elementary School (K-5)
Woodlawn Middle School (6-8)
Adlai E. Stevenson High School (9-12)

Geography
It is located at  (42.179529, -88.050546).

Transportation
Daily commuters to Chicago and other workplaces can use the Metra train station in Palatine, Illinois; others use Illinois Highway 53 to reach Interstate 90.

References

External links
Village of Kildeer official website

Villages in Illinois
Villages in Lake County, Illinois
Populated places established in 1958